Coleophora caelebipennella is a moth of the family Coleophoridae. It is found in most of Europe, except Great Britain, Ireland and the Balkan Peninsula. It is also known from Pakistan.

The wingspan is 13–16 mm.

The larvae feed on Artemisia campestris, Artemisia vulgaris, Centaurea, Chrysanthemum, Gnaphalium, Helichrysum arenarium, Helichrysum italicum, Helichrysum italicum serotinum and Helichrysum stoechas. They create a two-valved, brownish black, matt, silken case with a length of 12–15 mm. The mouth angle is about 45°. Larvae can be found from September to July.

References

caelebipennella
Moths of Europe
Moths of Asia